Richard Malden "Dick" Heckstall-Smith (26 September 1934 – 17 December 2004) was an English jazz and blues saxophonist. He played with some of the most influential English blues rock and jazz fusion bands of the 1960s and 1970s. He is known for primarily playing tenor, soprano, and baritone saxophones, as well as piano, clarinet and alto saxophone.

Early years
Heckstall-Smith was born in the Royal Free Hospital, in Ludlow, Shropshire, England, and was raised in Knighton, Radnorshire, learning to play piano, clarinet and alto saxophone in childhood. He attended a York boarding school but refused a second term there, instead enrolling in Gordonstoun, where his father had accepted a job as headmaster of the local grammar school.

Heckstall-Smith completed his education at Dartington Hall School, before reading agriculture – and co-leading the university jazz band – at Sidney Sussex College, Cambridge, from 1953. Aged 15, he had taken up the soprano sax while at Dartington, captivated by the sound of Sidney Bechet. Then Lester Young and tenor saxophonist bebop jazzman Wardell Gray proved to be major influences for him.

Musical career
Heckstall-Smith was an active member of the London jazz scene from the late 1950s (including a six-month stint from December 1957 with the band led by clarinettist Sandy Brown). He joined Blues Incorporated, Alexis Korner's groundbreaking blues group, in 1962, recording the album R&B from the Marquee. The following year, he was a founding member of that band's breakaway unit, The Graham Bond Organisation. In 1967, Heckstall-Smith became a member of guitarist-vocalist John Mayall's blues rock band, Bluesbreakers. That jazz-skewed edition of the band also included drummer Jon Hiseman, bassist Tony Reeves, and future Rolling Stones guitarist Mick Taylor. They released the album Bare Wires in 1968.

From 1968 to 1971, Heckstall-Smith, Hiseman, and Reeves were members of the pioneering UK jazz-rock band Colosseum. The band afforded Heckstall-Smith an opportunity to showcase his writing and instrumental virtuosity, playing two saxophones simultaneously.

When Colosseum broke up in October 1971, Heckstall-Smith recorded solo albums and fronted and played in several other fusion units, including Manchild, Sweet Pain, Big Chief, Tough Tenors, The Famous Bluesblasters, Mainsqueeze, and DHSS. Collaborating musicians common to many of these outfits included Victor Brox, Keith Tillman and harp player John O'Leary, a founder member of Savoy Brown. In the 1980s,, in his Electric Dream ensemble Heckstall-Smith also worked with the South African percussionist Julian Bahula. From 1983 to 1986, Heckstall-Smith was a member of 3-Space with John James (guitar), fellow Mainsqueeze member Dave Moore (keys), and Chris Billings (bass), with Paul Harris on keys for one tour. Apart from tenor and soprano sax, Heckstall-Smith also played baritone sax in 3-Space.

Heckstall-Smith participated in a 1994 reunion of the original Colosseum lineup and played in the hard-working Hamburg Blues Band. In 2001, he recorded the all-star project Blues and Beyond, which reunited him with Mayall, Bruce, Taylor, ex-Mayall and Fleetwood Mac guitarist Peter Green.

Heckstall-Smith published his witty memoirs, The Safest Place in the World, in 1984; an expanded version, retitled Blowing the Blues, was published in 2004. He died aged 70 in 2004, as a result of acute liver failure.

Discography
 Blues and Beyond (2001)
 Obsession Fees, with John Etheridge group (R&M (Germany), 1998)
 Celtic Steppes (33 Jazz)
 On the Corner/Mingus in Newcastle (33 Jazz, 1998)
"Fat Guitar" album by Clas Yngström (1996)
 Bird in Widnes, with John Stevens (Konnex, 1995)
 This That, with Jack Bruce and John Stevens (Atonal, 1995)
 Celtic Steppes (Twentythree, 1995)
 Where One Is (1991)
 Live 1990, with John Etheridge, Rainer Glas, Joe Nay (L+R, 1991)
 Woza Nasu (Aura, 1991)
 A Story Ended (Bronze, 1972)
 Solid Bond with Graham Bond Organisation (Warner Bros, double album, May 1970)
There is a more complete discography at: https://www.discogs.com/artist/249817-Dick-Heckstall-Smith

Bibliography
 The Safest Place in the World: A Personal History of British Rhythm and Blues (Quartet, 1984)
 Blowing the Blues: Fifty Years Playing the British Blues, with Pete Grant (Clear Books, 2004)

References

External links
"Interview with Dick Heckstall-Smith", Let it Rock, July 2003.
Dick Heckstall-Smith Jack Bruce web diary entry and tribute
Dick Heckstall-Smith interviews on the Graham Bond website
Pete Brown – poet, lyricist – discusses influences with Dick Heckstall-Smith, Morgensterns Diary Service.
Dick Heckstall-Smith's Memories of Cyril Davies. "You don't know Dick – Introducing DH-S" – by Pete Grant.
Stephanie Lynne Thorburn, Soul Survivor: A Vignette Etude of Saxophonist Dick Heckstall-Smith, TrueFire. EBook text containing biography, interview and obituary. Retrieved 26 June 2012.

1934 births
2004 deaths
20th-century British male musicians
20th-century saxophonists
Alumni of Sidney Sussex College, Cambridge
Blues Incorporated members
British male jazz musicians
British male saxophonists
British rhythm and blues boom musicians
Colosseum (band) members
English blues musicians
English jazz saxophonists
English rock saxophonists
John Mayall & the Bluesbreakers members
Musicians from Shropshire
New Jazz Orchestra members
People educated at Dartington Hall School
People educated at Gordonstoun
People from Ludlow
The Graham Bond Organisation members